The Talgai Skull: An Investigation Into the Origin of the Australian Aborigines is a 1968 Australian film about the Talgai Skull.  It shared the 1968 Australian Film Institute Award for Best Documentary and won the 1969 Logie Award for Best Documentary.

References

External links
 The Talgai Skull at IMDb
 The Talgai Skull at the National Library of Australia
 The Talgai Skull at the Melbourne International Film Festival

1968 documentary films
1968 films
Documentary films about Aboriginal Australians
Australian documentary films
1960s English-language films